The Kirkland Lookout Ground House (Guard Station), located east of Joseph Creek in the Wallowa–Whitman National Forest near Joseph, Oregon, United States, was built in 1936.  It was listed on the National Register of Historic Places in 1991.

References 

National Register of Historic Places in Wallowa County, Oregon
Buildings and structures completed in 1936
Buildings and structures in Wallowa County, Oregon